Luanshan Town is an urban town in You County, Hunan Province, People's Republic of China.

Cityscape
The town is divided into 15 villages and one community, the following areas: Jianxin Community, Qinbei Village, Xianxian Village, Xianzhou Village, Xinhe Village, Dongyuan Village, Shanglong Village, Jiangchong Village, Jiangbian Village, Longhui Village, Nan'an Village, Pijia Village, Laocao Village, Taoyuan Village, and Sanlian Village.

References

External links

Divisions of You County